Lidia Chojecka-Leandro (born 25 January 1977) is a retired Polish middle- and long-distance runner who mainly competed in the 1500 metres and 3000 metres. She won bronze medals in the 1500 m at the 1997 and 1999 World Indoor Championships, and for the 3000 m at the 2006 World Indoor Championships. Chojecka is a six-time European Indoor Championships medallist in the 1500 m and 3000 m events, earning three golds and three silvers. She took the double at the 2007 European Indoor Championships, becoming the first runner, male or female, to win both events at the same championships. She had been one of the most consistent middle distance runners in Europe throughout the 1990s, and finished fifth and sixth in back-to-back Olympic 1500 m finals in 2000 and 2004.

As a 18-year old, Chojecka won the 1500 m at the 1995 European Under-20 Championships. She placed second in the event at the 1997 European U23 Championships to take gold two years later. As of 2022 Chojecka held eight Polish national records in distances ranging from 1000 to 5000 metres (1000 m indoor, 1500 m out and indoor, one mile indoor, 2000 m, 3000 m out and indoor and 5000 m). She won five Polish outdoor (1500 m, 5000 m, 10,000 m) and 13 indoor (800 m, 1500 m, 3000 m) titles.

Her husband and former coach is a Gabonese-born runner, Jean-Marc Léandro.

Achievements

Personal bests
 800 metres – 1:59.97 (Nuremberg 1999)
 800 metres indoor – 1:59.99 (Birmingham 1999)
 1000 metres – 2:42.89 (Sopot 1994) 
 1000 metres indoor – 2:36.97 (Liévin 2003) 
 1500 metres – 3:59.22 (Oslo 2000) 
 1500 metres indoor – 4:03.58 (Birmingham 2003) 
 One mile – 4:25.18 (Lausanne 1998)
 One mile indoor – 4:24.44 (Stuttgart 2000) 
 2000 metres – 5:38.44 (Brussels 2009) 
 3000 metres – 8:31.69 (Brussels 2002) 
 3000 metres indoor – 8:38.21 (Stuttgart 2007) 
 5000 metres – 15:04.88 (Berlin 2002) 
 10,000 metres – 32:55.10 (Warsaw 2007)

National titles
 Polish Athletics Championships
 1500 m: 1999, 2000, 2002
 5000 m: 2011
 10,000 m: 2007
 Polish Indoor Athletics Championships
 800 m: 1999, 2004
 1500 m: 1998, 1999, 2000, 2004, 2006, 2009
 3000 m: 2000, 2001, 2003, 2005, 2007

International competitions

See also
 Polish records in athletics

References

External links

 

1977 births
Living people
Polish female middle-distance runners
Athletes (track and field) at the 2000 Summer Olympics
Athletes (track and field) at the 2004 Summer Olympics
Athletes (track and field) at the 2008 Summer Olympics
Olympic athletes of Poland
People from Siedlce
Sportspeople from Masovian Voivodeship
Universiade medalists in athletics (track and field)
Universiade bronze medalists for Poland
Medalists at the 1997 Summer Universiade
Competitors at the 2001 Goodwill Games
20th-century Polish women
21st-century Polish women